The Tennis South Invitational, also known as the Mississippi Indoors, was a men's tennis tournament played in Jackson, Mississippi.  The event was played as part of the USLTA Indoor Circuit in 1974 and became a World Championship Tennis event in 1976. In its final year, 1977, it was part of the Grand Prix tennis circuit. The tournament was played on indoor carpet courts.

Finals

Singles

Doubles

External links
 ATP results archive

Grand Prix tennis circuit
Defunct tennis tournaments in the United States
Sports in Jackson, Mississippi
Carpet court tennis tournaments
World Championship Tennis
Tennis South Invitational